The Violin Sonata in F major, composed in 1820 by Felix Mendelssohn at the age of eleven, has three movements:

Allegro
Andante
 Presto

A typical performance lasts about 15 minutes. It was first published in 1977.

References
Notes

Source

External links 

Chamber music by Felix Mendelssohn
Mendelssohn
1820 compositions
Compositions in F major